Ankara 75th Anniversary Race Course is a horse racing track located at Batıkent neighborhood in Yenimahalle district of Ankara, Turkey. It is founded in 1998, which was the 75th anniversary of Turkish Republic's foundation.

Physical attributes
The race course covers an area of  consisting of facilities for racing, training and barns. The race course has three tracks as:

The track's total spectator capacity is 8,700 with 2,300 seats. The complex, built on four storeys, comprises offices, social and recreational facilities.

Major races
Republic of Turkey Stakes (Cumhuriyet Koşusu) is the most prestigious flat racing in Turkey after the Gazi Race, which is run at Veliefendi Race Course in Istanbul. The winner is awarded a total money prize of TL 1.275 million (approx. US$900,000 as of October 2010) accompanied by a trophy bestowed by the Turkish president.
Presidency Cup (Cumhurbaşkanlığı Koşusu), held since 1939 in honor of the Turkish president, is the country's another prestigious flat racing. The award totals to TL 743,750 (approx. US$520,000 as of October 2010) and a trophy bestowed by the Turkish president.

References

Horse racing venues in Turkey
Sports venues in Ankara
Sports venues completed in 1998
Yenimahalle, Ankara